The Kodavanar River, is a river in the Palni Hills in Tamil Nadu. It is a tributary of the Amaravati River.

References 

Rivers of Tamil Nadu
Rivers of India